Selina Bracebridge (née Mills; 1800 – 1874) was a British artist, medical reformer, and travel writer.

Selina Bracebridge studied art under the celebrated artist Samuel Prout, and travelled widely as part of her art education.

She married Charles Holte Bracebridge (1799-1872) in 1824, and lived in Athens for much of the 1830s.

She became close friends with Florence Nightingale in 1846, and the Bracebridges travelled with her to Rome from 1847 to 1848, and around Europe, Greece, and Egypt between 1849 and 1850.

The Bracebridges acted as administrative assistants to Nightingale for nine months at the Barrack Hospital during the Crimean War. When Nightingale fell dangerously ill at Balaclava in May 1855 they escorted her back to Scutari.

She is one of the subjects in Jerry Barrett’s large 1857 painting The Mission of Mercy: Florence Nightingale receiving the Wounded at Scutari.

She and Nightingale remained close until her death in 1874, and Nightingale lamented her loss in a letter, saying ‘She was more than a mother to me’.

Selected works
A Fortified Town on a Hilltop (North side of the Acropolis, Athens), watercolour, c. 1825-1855
 Palestine, an album containing 5 maps, 2 architectural drawings, 36 landscape sketches and 4 etchings, c.1833

References

External links
 A Mirror For Medicine: some resources of the Wellcome Institute Library (via archive.org)

1800 births
1874 deaths
British women travel writers
British travel writers
19th-century British women artists
19th-century British women writers
19th-century British writers